Maynard Mack (October 27, 1909 – March 17, 2001) was an American literary critic and English professor. Mack earned both his bachelor's degree (1932; Alpheus Henry Snow Prize) and Ph.D. (1936) at Yale. An expert on Shakespeare and Alexander Pope, Mack taught at Yale University for many years, starting as an instructor of English in 1936 and ending his career as Sterling Professor Emeritus of English. He was remembered as an inspiring lecturer whose lectures on Shakespeare were described in one account as "unforgettable."

Works

Books

 
 
 
 Poetic Traditions of the English Renaissance (1982)
 The Last and Greatest Art (1984)
 
 Prose and Cons: Monologues on Several Occasions (1989)
 
 (as editor) The Twickenham Edition of the Poems of Alexander Pope (1939-1969) (12 vols.)

See also
 Literary criticism
 English studies
 Alexander Pope
 William Shakespeare
 Sterling Professor

References

Sources

External links 

 Maynard Mack Papers. Yale Collection of American Literature, Beinecke Rare Book and Manuscript Library.

1909 births
American academics of English literature
American literary critics
Literary critics of English
Shakespearean scholars
Yale University alumni
Yale University faculty
Yale Sterling Professors
2001 deaths
Corresponding Fellows of the British Academy
Presidents of the Modern Language Association